Edward Daniel McKeever MBE (born 27 August 1983) is a British kayak athlete. He is a former European, World and Olympic champion.

McKeever won the gold medal at the 2012 Olympic Games in the K-1 200m event.

He won two medals at the 2010 ICF Canoe Sprint World Championships in Poznań with a gold in the K-1 200 m and a silver in the K-1 4 × 200 m events, and a further silver in the K-1 200m at the 2011 event in Szeged.

World Championships
In 2012 McKeever won the K1 200m event at the World Cup in Poznan he also won the K1 200m at the European Championships in 2010 Trasona, Spain and the kayak World Cup race in Szeged, Hungary. McKeever still competes for the Bradford on Avon rowing club, despite moving to south Buckinghamshire to train at the 2012 Olympic race venue of Dorney lake.

In 2012, McKeever won gold medal in the K1 200m event, in Canoe sprint World Cup.

Olympics 2012
He competed in the canoe sprint team for London Olympics 2012 in the Men’s K1 200m.  He qualified for the K1 200m final after achieving a new Olympic best of 35.087 seconds in the heats and on 11 August he won the gold medal in the event.

McKeever was appointed Member of the Order of the British Empire (MBE) in the 2013 New Year Honours for services to kayaking.

See also
 2012 Olympics gold post boxes in the United Kingdom

References

External links
Canoe09.ca profile 
Official Website

1983 births
Living people
Sportspeople from Bath, Somerset
People from Bradford-on-Avon
Alumni of Kingston University
English male canoeists
Canoeists at the 2012 Summer Olympics
Members of the Order of the British Empire
Olympic canoeists of Great Britain
English Olympic medallists
Olympic gold medallists for Great Britain
Olympic medalists in canoeing
English accountants
ICF Canoe Sprint World Championships medalists in kayak
Medalists at the 2012 Summer Olympics
European Games medalists in canoeing
British male canoeists
Canoeists at the 2015 European Games
European Games silver medalists for Great Britain